Zephaniah 3 is the third (and last) chapter of the Book of Zephaniah in the Hebrew Bible or the Old Testament of the Christian Bible. This book contains the prophecies attributed to the prophet Zephaniah, and is a part of the Book of the Twelve Minor Prophets. This chapter contains further indictments against the Jerusalem community, a prophecy of salvation for Judah and the Nations with Yahweh reigning victoriously as king in Jerusalem.

Text
The original text was written in Hebrew language. This chapter is divided into 20 verses.

Textual witnesses
Some early manuscripts containing the text of this chapter in Hebrew are of the Masoretic Text tradition, which includes the Codex Cairensis (895), the Petersburg Codex of the Prophets (916), Aleppo Codex (10th century), and Codex Leningradensis (1008). Fragments containing parts of this chapter in Hebrew were found among the Dead Sea Scrolls, including 4Q77 (4QXIIb; 150–125 BCE) with extant verses 19–20; 4Q78 (4QXIIc; 75–50 BCE) with extant verses 1–2; 4Q82 (4QXIIg; 25 BCE) with extant verses 3–5; and Wadi Murabba'at Minor Prophets (Mur88; MurXIIProph; 75-100 CE) with extant verses 1–6, 8–20.

There is also a translation into Koine Greek known as the Septuagint, made in the last few centuries BCE. Extant ancient manuscripts of the Septuagint version include Codex Vaticanus (B; B; 4th century), Codex Sinaiticus (S; BHK: S; 4th century), Codex Alexandrinus (A; A; 5th century) and Codex Marchalianus (Q; Q; 6th century). Fragments containing parts of this chapter in Greek (a revision of the Septuagint) were found among the Dead Sea Scrolls, that is, Naḥal Ḥever (8ḤevXIIgr; 1st century CE) with extant verses 6–7.

Further Indictments against the Jerusalem Community (3:1–8)
After the oracles against the neighboring nations, the judgment of God is announced for Jerusalem for all her sins, but concludes with an announcement of his judgment against the nations.

Verse 8
"Therefore wait for Me," says the Lord,
"Until the day I rise up for plunder;
My determination is to gather the nations
To My assembly of kingdoms,
To pour on them My indignation,
All My fierce anger;
All the earth shall be devoured
With the fire of My jealousy."
"For plunder": or "for witness" in Greek Septuagint and Syriac version; Targum reads "for the day of My revelation for judgment"; Vulgate has "for the day of My resurrection that is to come"

Salvation for Judah and the Nations (3:9–13)
Following the threat of judgment against the nations in Zephaniah 3:8, the salvation of Israel will come and have universal consequences.

Verse 9
"For then I will restore to the peoples a pure language,
That they all may call on the name of the Lord,
To serve Him with one accord."
"Language": literally, "lip", from Hebrew: ,

Yahweh's Reign as King in Jerusalem (3:14–20)
The joy of Yahweh's victorious kingship in the midst of the people is the theme of the closing section of this book.

Verse 16
In that day it shall be said to Jerusalem:
"Do not fear;
Zion, let not your hands be weak.

Verse 17
 The Lord your God in your midst,
 The Mighty One, will save;
 He will rejoice over you with gladness,
 He will quiet you with His love,
 He will rejoice over you with singing."
 "The Mighty One, will save" is translated from Hebrew: גבור יושיע gib-bōr yō-shî-a'''. The word "gibbor" (= "mighty"), here as an attribute of God, is used in Isaiah 9:6 as one of the attributes of Messiah, who "has all power in heaven and earth"; whereas the word "yoshia" has the same root verb "yasha''" (="to save"), the main theme of this passage.

See also
Ethiopia
Jerusalem
Judah
Zion
 Related Bible parts: Deuteronomy 32, Jeremiah 29, Hebrews 12

Notes

References

Sources

External links

Jewish translations:
 Zephaniah (Judaica Press) translation with Rashi's commentary at Chabad.org
Christian translations:
Online Bible at GospelHall.org (ESV, KJV, Darby, American Standard Version, Bible in Basic English)
  Various versions

03